The 2018–19 Miami RedHawks men's basketball team represented Miami University during the 2018–19 NCAA Division I men's basketball season. The RedHawks, led by second-year head coach Jack Owens, played their home games at Millett Hall, as members of the East Division of the Mid-American Conference. They finished the season 15–17 overall, 7–11 in MAC play to finish in fifth place in the East Division. As the No. 9 seed in the MAC tournament, they were defeated in the first round by Akron.

Previous season
The RedHawks finished with a record of 16-18, 8-10 in MAC play for the 2017–18 season which netted them a third place finish. They lost to Western Michigan as a No. 12 seed in the MAC tournament. In the first round of the MAC tournament they advanced by defeating Ohio after which in the quarterfinals they lost to Toledo. They were invited to the College Basketball Invitational where they lost in the first round to Campbell.

Roster

Schedule and results

The 2018-19 non-conference schedule was released on July 20, 2018. The MAC conference schedule was announced on August 1, 2018. The RedHawks will participate in the Islands of Bahamas Showcase in Nassau, Bahamas.

|-
!colspan=9 style=|Exhibition

|-
!colspan=9 style=| Non-conference regular season

|-
!colspan=9 style=|MAC regular season

|-
!colspan=9 style=|MAC tournament
|-

See also
 2018–19 Miami RedHawks women's basketball team

References

Miami
Miami RedHawks men's basketball seasons